Joseph Anthony Pellegrini (born April 8, 1957) is a former professional American football player who played offensive lineman for five seasons for the New York Jets and the Atlanta Falcons.

External links
 Jets player page

1957 births
Living people
Players of American football from Boston
American football offensive guards
American football centers
Harvard Crimson football players
New York Jets players
Atlanta Falcons players